The 2010 Golden Horses Health Sanctuary Malaysian Open was a tennis tournament played on outdoor hard courts. It was the inaugural edition of the Malaysian Open and was an International tournament on the WTA Tour. The event took place from February 22 to February 28 at the Bukit Kiara Equestrian and Country Resort.

The event was headlined by the participation of World No. 7 and Olympic champion Elena Dementieva in the main draw. Other participants include recent Australian Open semi-finalists, World No. 10 Li Na and World No. 20 Zheng Jie and last years Wimbledon quarter-finalist and Family Circle Cup champion, Sabine Lisicki.

Entrants

Seeds

1 Rankings as of February 15, 2010.

Other entrants
The following players received wildcards into the main draw:
 Noppawan Lertcheewakarn
 Alicia Molik
 Yan Zi

The following players received entry from the qualifying draw:
 Elena Bovina
 Anna Gerasimou
 Ksenia Pervak
 Yurika Sema

Finals

Singles

 Alisa Kleybanova defeated  Elena Dementieva 6–3, 6–2
It was Kleybanova's 1st career title.

Doubles

 Chan Yung-jan /  Zheng Jie defeated  Anastasia Rodionova /  Arina Rodionova 6–7(4–7), 6–2, [10–7]

External links
 ITF tournament edition details
 Players announcement

Tennis tournaments in Malaysia
Malaysian Open
Malaysian Open (tennis)
2010 in Malaysian tennis